In combinatorial mathematics, the Lobb number Lm,n counts the number of ways that n + m open parentheses and n − m close parentheses can be arranged to form the start of a valid sequence of balanced parentheses.

Lobb numbers form a natural generalization of the Catalan numbers, which count the number of complete strings of balanced parentheses of a given length. Thus, the nth Catalan number equals the Lobb number L0,n. They are named after Andrew Lobb, who used them  to give a simple inductive proof of the formula for the nth Catalan number.

The Lobb numbers are parameterized by two non-negative integers m and n with n ≥ m ≥ 0.  The (m, n)th Lobb number Lm,n is given in terms of binomial coefficients by the formula

An alternative expression for Lobb number Lm,n is:

The triangle of these numbers starts as 

where the diagonal is

and the left column are the Catalan Numbers

As well as counting sequences of parentheses, the Lobb numbers also count the number of ways in which n + m copies of the value +1 and n − m copies of the value −1 may be arranged into a sequence such that all of the partial sums of the sequence are non-negative.

Ballot counting
The combinatorics of parentheses is replaced with counting ballots in an election with two candidates in Bertrand's ballot theorem, first published by William Allen Whitworth in 1878. The theorem states the probability that winning candidate is ahead in the count, given known final tallies for each candidate.

References

Integer sequences
Factorial and binomial topics
Enumerative combinatorics